Stedocys is a genus of Asian spitting spiders that was first described by H. Ono in 1995.

Species
 it contains thirteen species, found in Asia:
Stedocys amamiensis Suguro, 2019 – Japan
Stedocys gaolingensis Wu & Li, 2017 – China
Stedocys huangniuensis Wu & Li, 2017 – China
Stedocys leopoldi (Giltay, 1935) – Malaysia, Thailand
Stedocys ludiyanensis Wu & Li, 2017 – China
Stedocys matuoensis Wu & Li, 2017 – China
Stedocys pagodas Labarque, Grismado, Ramírez, Yan & Griswold, 2009 – China
Stedocys pulianensis Wu & Li, 2017 – China
Stedocys shilinensis Wu & Li, 2017 – China
Stedocys uenorum Ono, 1995 (type) – Thailand
Stedocys xiangzhouensis Wu & Li, 2017 – China
Stedocys xianrenensis Wu & Li, 2017 – China
Stedocys zhaoi Wu & Li, 2017 – Thailand

See also
 List of Scytodidae species

References

Araneomorphae genera
Scytodidae
Spiders of Asia